The Kanu Ndubuisi Park is a public park and recreational center located in Ikeja, Lagos. It is a green space created and managed by the Lagos State Parks and Garden Agency. The park has a lawn tennis court, a basketball court, a play area for children, seats and benches, patios and sheds and snacks stands. It has a large green area for residents to host picnics and relax. It is in close proximity to the Johnson Jakande Tinubu Park.

Gallery

References

Parks in Lagos
Landmarks in Lagos